Frazer is a census-designated place (CDP) in Valley County, Montana, United States, located within the Fort Peck Indian Reservation, about 80 miles from the Canadian border. The population was 420 at the 2020 census.

The St. Paul, Minneapolis & Manitoba Railway established Frazer as a station in 1888. A post office opened in 1907.

Geography
Frazer is located at  (48.048907, -106.048572).

Demographics

Education
Frazer School educates students from kindergarten through 12th grade. Frazer High School's team name is the Bearcubs.

References

Census-designated places in Montana
Census-designated places in Valley County, Montana
Montana populated places on the Missouri River
Fort Peck Assiniboine and Sioux Tribes